Peter Smith (born 18 September 1978) in Rhuddlan, Wales, is a Welsh retired professional footballer who played as a forward for several teams in the Football League.

References

1978 births
Living people
People from Rhuddlan
Sportspeople from Denbighshire
Welsh footballers
Association football forwards
Crewe Alexandra F.C. players
Macclesfield Town F.C. players
Telford United F.C. players
Rhyl F.C. players
Colwyn Bay F.C. players
English Football League players